As'ad Adib Bayudh (died 2010) was a Lebanese Greek Orthodox politician. He was elected to the Parliament of Lebanon from the Marjeyoun-Hasbaya constituency in southern Lebanon in the 1960 and 1964 elections.

References

2010 deaths
20th-century Lebanese politicians
Year of birth missing